The Trans-Saharan Railway was a project conducted by France to build a rail line south through Algeria to sub-Saharan Africa. Its original intended use was to connect coal mines and boost trade throughout North Africa, tie together the French Empire, and connect North Africa to sub-Saharan Africa by connecting the existing rail system of French Algeria to those of French West Africa. The plan for the rail line was first proposed in 1879. The Chamber of Deputies allocated 800,000 francs for an expedition, but the Flatters expedition, named after its leader Paul Flatters, ended in failure when the survey team was massacred by Tuareg in 1881. An engineer, Monsieur A. Duponchel, was the creator of the large plan; in 1900, French paper Le Matin announced that it would proceed by private initiative following a long campaign in its favour by Pierre Paul Leroy-Beaulieu.

However, it wasn't until the Vichy France government that it was actively promoted. It was viewed as a way to increase the integrity of the French Empire and the spirit of the French nation as a whole.

The railway had numerous proposed benefits. It would provide a fast connection to Sudan and enable Sudan's resources to be within France's reach. Additionally, the railway was supposed to transform the region and make it a leading producer in cotton and agricultural goods. The cattle population and rice production would increase dramatically and benefit society.

World War II coincided with the construction of the railway which led to it being built by slave labor in 1941–1942. Forced labor camps were dispersed throughout the country and the trans-Saharan railroad project connected them. Jews and other prisoners were forced to work on the project. The workers "were poorly fed and housed, and lived in terrible sanitary conditions. Tortures and atrocities were inflicted by the guards for the slightest breach of the rules; the internees were not treated as human beings. Many died from beatings; even more died from outbreaks of typhus or just from exhaustion and hunger."

Ultimately, the trans-Saharan railway was never completed; only a small portion of the tracks was built. Construction stopped in 1944 due to lack of financial support, and in 1945 continuation was officially rejected.

See also
 Trans-Sahara Highway

References 

Rail infrastructure in Algeria